× Sorbaronia is a hybrid genus of flowering plants belonging to the family Rosaceae.

Its native range is Eastern Canada.

Species:
 × Sorbaronia mitschurinii
× Sorbaronia arsenii 
× Sorbaronia jackii 
× Sorbaronia monstrosa 
× Sorbaronia sorbifolia

References

Maleae
Plant nothogenera
Rosaceae genera